The 2018 Polish Athletics Championships was the 94th edition of the national championship in outdoor track and field for athletes in Poland. It was held between 20 and 22 July 2018 in Lublin.

Medal summary

Men

Women

Cross country 
The 90th Polish Cross Country Championships took place on 17 March in Żagań.

Men

Women

50 km walk
The 1st Polish Championships in women's 50 kilometres race walk took place on 24 March in Dudince, hosted within the annual Dudinská Päťdesiatka race. The men's race wook place on 6 October in Vienna.

Marathon
The 88th Polish Marathon Championships took place on 22 April in Warsaw, hosted within the annual Orlen Warsaw Marathon. The 38th Polish Women's Marathon Championships took place on 8 April as part of the 45th Dębno Marathon.

10,000 metres
The Polish Championships in the 10,000 metres took place on 28 April in Łomża.

Relay and combined events championships 
The Polish Relay and Combined Events Championships took place on 1 and 2 June in Suwałki. It was the first time that the  Mixed 4 × 400 and 4 × 800 metres relays were held.

Men

Women

Mixed relay

5K run 
The 7th Polish 5K Championships took place on 16 June in Warsaw.

20 km walk
The Polish Championships in the 20 kilometres race walk took place on 23 June in Warsaw.

Richard Vargas of Venezuela won the race as a guest athlete with a time of 1:22:10

10K run 
The 9th Polish 10K Championships were held on 4 August in Gdańsk as part of the 25th edition of the Saint Dominic Road Race. The 7th Polish Women's 10K Championships took place on 7 October in Warsaw.

Silas Mwetich of Kenya won the race as a guest athlete in a time of 29:28

Half marathon
The 27th Polish Half Marathon Championships took place on 2 September in Piła.

24-hour run 
The 2019 Polish Championships in 24-hour run were held from 8–9 September near Łyse, Masovian Voivodeship.

References 

Results

External links
Polish Athletics Association website 

Polish Championships
Polish Athletics Championships
2018
Sport in Lublin